Victor Benito Galeone (born 1935) is an American prelate of the Roman Catholic Church.  He served as bishop of the Diocese of St. Augustine in Florida from 2001 to 2011.

Biography

Early life 
Victor Galeone was born in Philadelphia, Pennsylvania, on September 13, 1935, the son of Angelo and Rita Galeone and the fourth of five children. He attended St. Elizabeth of Hungary Parochial School in Highlandtown, Baltimore.  After deciding to become a priest, Galeone in 1949 entered the minor seminary of St. Charles College in Catonsville, Maryland. Galeone was then sent to Rome to enter the Pontifical North American College and study at the Pontifical Gregorian University.

Priesthood 
Galeone was ordained to the priesthood for the Archdiocese of Baltimore by Bishop Martin J. O’Connor in the chapel of the North American College on December 18, 1960. He received his Licentiate in Sacred Theology and Bachelor of Theology degree from the Gregorian University in 1961.

On his return to Baltimore in 1961, Galeone was assigned as an associate pastor in several parishes in the archdiocese. He started teaching at St. Paul Latin High School in Baltimore and soon became principal. Galeone received a Master of Education degree from Loyola College Maryland in Baltimore in 1969.

In 1970, Galeone traveled to Peru to serve a five year term as a missionary priest for the Missionary Society of St. James.  After his time in Peru, he had pastoral assignments in the archdiocese for the next three years. In 1978, Galeone went back to Peru, serving again there with the Missionary Society until 1985.

On returning to Baltimore, Galeone served as pastor in several archdiocese parishes. In 1989 to 1996, Galeone was appointed pastor of St. Thomas More Parish in Baltimore. In December, 1995, Pope Paul II named Galeone as a prelate of honor, with the title of monsignor. After seven years at St. Thomas More, he was reassigned in 1996 as pastor of St. Agnes Parish in Catonsville, Maryland, his final assignment with the archdiocese. Galeone's archdiocesan positions included parochial vicar and memberships on the Priests Council, the College of Consultors and the national board of directors of the Holy Childhood Association.

Bishop of St. Augustine 
On June 26, 2001, John Paul II appointed Galeone as bishop of the Diocese of St. Augustine.  He was consecrated on August 21, 2001, in the Cathedral Basilica of St. Augustine. Archbishop John C. Favalora served as the principal consecrator with Bishop Snyder and Bishop W. Francis Malooly serving as the principal co-consecrators. Galeone's episcopal motto is "Love, Joy, Peace."

In 2003, a Florida woman wrote Galeone about being sexually abused when she was 11 years old by William Malone, a diocese priest. The woman had brought these same accusations in 1991 to Bishop John J. Snyder.  The diocese had dismissed the accusations then as being not credible.  After receiving her recent complaint, Galeone met with the woman, but never submitted the accusation to the Diocesan Review Board, nor contacted the local district attorney.  This was despite the fact that the diocese was providing financial support for Malone's child by another victim.  In 2018, Malone was added to a list of diocese priests with credible accusations of child sexual abuse.

Galeone is arguably one of the most outspoken orthodox bishops in the country. He has, on several occasions, strongly condemned birth control and politicians who support abortion rights for women.In April 2016, Galeone remove Stephen Charest from his post as pastor of Holy Spirit Parish in Lake Wales, Florida.  Charest had been arrested on April 20, 2016 for solicitation to commit lewdness. Charest was arrested after soliciting a sex act from an undercover sheriff's deputy in a wooded area in the town.

Galeone's letter of resignation as bishop of the Diocese of St. Augustine was accepted by Pope Benedict XVI on April 27, 2011. Galeone was succeeded by Bishop Felipe de Jesus Estevez in June 2011.

Bibliography
On February 4, 2015, Galeone's book, Joyful Good News: for Young and Old, was published by the Magnificat Institute Press. ASIN: B00T708RTK

See also
 

 Catholic Church hierarchy
 Catholic Church in the United States
 Historical list of the Catholic bishops of the United States
 List of Catholic bishops of the United States
 Lists of patriarchs, archbishops, and bishops

References

External links
Official biography including photos, pastoral statements and homilies
Diocese of St. Augustine, Florida
The St. Augustine Catholic, Diocesan Magazine

Episcopal succession

St. Mary's Seminary and University alumni
Pontifical Gregorian University alumni
Roman Catholic Archdiocese of Baltimore
Roman Catholic bishops of Saint Augustine
1935 births
Religious leaders from Baltimore
American people of Italian descent
Living people
Pontifical North American College alumni
21st-century Roman Catholic bishops in the United States